Tedatioxetine (developmental code name Lu AA24530) is an experimental antidepressant that was discovered by scientists at Lundbeck; in 2007 Lundbeck and Takeda entered into a partnership that included tedatioxetine but was focused on another, more advanced Lundbeck drug candidate, vortioxetine.

Tedatioxetine is reported to act as a triple reuptake inhibitor (serotonin > norepinephrine > dopamine) and 5-HT2A, 5-HT2C, 5-HT3, and α1A-adrenergic receptor antagonist. 

As of 2009, it was in phase II clinical trials for major depressive disorder, but there have been no updates since then, and as of August 2013 it was no longer displayed on Lundbeck's product pipeline.

On May 10, 2016, all work on tedatioxetine stopped.

A Chinese patent shows that there has been interest in this compound outside of Lundbeck.

See also
 MIN-117
 TGBA01AD
 Vilazodone
 Vortioxetine

References

External links
 Lu AA24530 shows positive results in major depressive disorder phase II study

4-Piperidinyl compounds
Abandoned drugs
Antidepressants
Thioethers